Cherry Ripe may refer to:

 Cherry Ripe (chocolate bar), a brand of chocolate bar made by Cadbury
 Cherry Ripe (numbers station), a suspected cryptic British radio station
 Cherry Ripe (song), an English poetic song 
 Cherry Ripe (novel), an 1878 novel
 Cherry Ripe (film), a 1921 silent film